Bardet–Biedl syndrome 12 is a protein that in humans is encoded by the BBS12 gene.

Mutations in this gene are associated with the Bardet–Biedl syndrome.

References

Further reading

External links
 GeneReviews/NIH/NCBI/UW entry on Bardet–Biedl Syndrome